Hjem til gården 2020 (Home to the Farm 2020) is the fourth season of the Danish version of The Farm. 14 contestants from across Denmark come to the farm and live like it was 100 years ago. Each week, the head of the farm nominates one person to be in a duel, the nominee then chooses who they'll face off against in one of three challenges. The person who loses the duel is sent home but not before writing a letter delivered to the farm stating who the head of farm for the next week is. The winner wins a grand prize of 500,000 kr. The season was originally supposed to premiere on 29 March 2020 but was pushed back due to the COVID-19 pandemic. As a result, the season ended up premiering on 21 June 2020.

Finishing order
All contestants entered on Day 1.

The game

References

External links

The Farm (franchise)
Danish television series